Milton is a village located immediately north of Liverpool, Nova Scotia in the Region of Queens Nova Scotia. The village is most well known for being the birthplace of the international best selling author Margaret Marshall Saunders. Her most famous book was Beautiful Joe. In 1994, the Beautiful Joe Heritage Society was formed to celebrate the life and story of Beautiful Joe and the achievements of Margaret Marshall Saunders. The book is set in Meaford, Ontario, where the society has established a park dedicated to Beautiful Joe named Beautiful Joe Park.

As of 2021, the population was 999. The Mersey River, paralleled by Trunk 8, passes directly through Milton.

Demographics 

Notable residents 
Gene Ford
Sam Gloade
Margaret Marshall Saunders

References 

General Service Areas in Nova Scotia
Communities in the Region of Queens Municipality
Designated places in Nova Scotia